The 2007 Wales rugby union tour of Australia was a series of two matches played, to prepare the 2007 Rugby World Cup, in May–June 2007 in Australia by Wales national rugby union team.

Wales lost both tests.

Results

First test

Second test

References

2007 rugby union tours
2006–07 in Welsh rugby union
2007
2007 in Australian rugby union
2007
History of rugby union matches between Australia and Wales